Robin Simon (born 23 July 1947)  is a British art historian and critic, editor of the British Art Journal.

Simon was a tenured academic at the University of Nottingham, teaching both English Literature and Art History, and was then Director of the Institute of European Studies in London before becoming editor of Apollo magazine in 1990. He has written and lectured extensively on Italian art of the fourteenth century and on British art, especially of the eighteenth century, on theatre and music, and on the history of cricket. He has been art critic of the Daily Mail since 1987. From 2007 he has been Visiting Professor in the Department of English at University College London and since 2018 Professorial Research Fellow in Art History at Buckingham University.

Simon is the son of the late Archbishop of Wales Glyn Simon; he is married to the wine and food writer Joanna Simon.

Selected books and publications
The Art of Cricket (with Alastair Smart) (1983)
The Portrait in Britain and America (1987)
Buckingham Palace: A complete guide (ed) (1993)
The King’s Apartments, Hampton Court Palace (ed) (1994)
The National Trust 1895–1995: 100 great treasures (co-ed) (1995)
Lord Leighton 1830–1896 and Leighton House (ed) (1996)
A Rake’s Progress: From Hogarth to Hockney (co-ed) (1997)
Enlightened Self-interest: The Foundling Hospital and Hogarth (co-ed) (1997)
Oxford: Art and architecture (ed) (1997)
Somerset House: The building and collections (ed) (2001)
Public Artist, Private Passions: The world of Edward Linley Sambourne (ed) (2001) 
The Tyranny of Treatment: Samuel Johnson, his friends, and Georgian medicine (co-ed) (2003)
Hogarth, France and British Art: The Rise of the Arts in Eighteenth-Century Britain (2007)
Johan Zoffany: Society Observed (contrib) (2011)
Richard Wilson and the Transformation of European Landscape Painting (with Martin Postle) (2014)
Hogarth Reynolds Turner: Pittura inglese verso la modernità (contrib) (2014)
The Royal Academy of Arts: History and Collections (ed) (2018)

References

Academics of University College London
British art historians
British art critics
1947 births
Living people
Academics of the University of Nottingham
Fellows of the Society of Antiquaries of London